This is a list of important events relating to the LGBT community from 1801 to 1900. The earliest published studies of lesbian activity were written in the early 19th century.

1800s

1802 
The French Republic annexes Piedmont, thus extending the French Penal Code of 1791 to the annexed territory.

1803 
The last recorded state sanctioned execution for male same-sex sodomy occurs in the Batavian Commonwealth and continental Europe.

1807 
 One of the early known same-sex couples in American history, Vermont residents Charity Bryant and Sylvia Drake, begin their relationship. This couple is most strongly documented in historian Rachel Hope Cleves' 2014 book Charity and Sylvia: A Same-Sex Marriage in Early America.
 The Duchy of Warsaw is created, re-legalizing same-sex sexual intercourse.

1809 
The French Empire annexes the States of the Church, thus extending the Napoleonic Code to the annexed territory.

1810s

1811 
 The Netherlands abolish laws criminalizing homosexual conduct.
 The French Empire annexes the German North Sea coast, thus extending the Napoleonic Code to the annexed territory.

1812 
 The French Empire annexes Catalonia, thus extending the Napoleonic Code to the annexed territory.

1813 
 The Kingdom of Bavaria abolishes laws criminalizing homosexual conduct between consenting adults.

1814 
 The term "crime against nature" first used in the criminal code in the United States.

1815 
 The Duchy of Warsaw is annexed between the Kingdom of Prussia and the Russian Empire, thus re-criminalizing same-sex sexual intercourse in Prussian annexed territory.

1820s

1822 
  The Dominican Republic decriminalizes homosexuality.
El Salvador decriminalizes homosexuality.

1824 
 28 October — The Marquis de Custine is beaten and left for dead after propositioning a male soldier in Saint-Denis. The scandal forces him out of the closet, but he recovers and lives the rest of his life as an open 'sodomite' with his partner Edward St. Barbe. Custine maintains a successful social life in Paris.

1830s

1830 
 Empire of Brazil decriminalizes homosexuality.

1832 
 The Russian Empire criminalizes muzhelozhstvo, which courts interpret to mean anal sex between men, under Article 995 of the criminal code. Men convicted were stripped of their legal rights and sent to Siberia for four to five years.
 Bolivia decriminalizes homosexuality.

1835 
 For the first time in history, homosexuality becomes illegal in Congress Poland, Russian part of the Poland acquired after the Partitions of Poland after it became part of the Russian Empire.
 The last known execution for homosexuality in Great Britain. James Pratt and John Smith are hanged at Newgate prison, London after being caught together in private lodgings

1840s

1840 
 Hannover abolishes laws criminalizing homosexual conduct between consenting adults.

1850s

1852 
 Portugal decriminalizes homosexual acts.

1853 
 Argentina decriminalizes homosexuality.

1856 
 The first known reference to lesbians in Mormon history occurred in 1856, when a Salt Lake man noted in his diary that a Mormon woman was "trying to seduce a young girl".

1858 
 The Ottoman Empire (predecessor of Turkey) decriminalizes homosexuality during its Tanzimat reform period.

1860s

1861 
 In England, the Offences against the Person Act 1861 is amended to remove the death sentence for "buggery" (which had not been used since 1836). The penalty became imprisonment from 10 years to life.

1865 
 San Marino decriminalizes homosexuality.

1867 
  29 August — Karl Heinrich Ulrichs became the first homosexual to speak out publicly in defence of homosexuality when he pleaded at the Congress of German Jurists in Munich for a resolution urging the repeal of anti-homosexual laws. He was shouted down. In an interview, Robert Beachy said "I think it is reasonable to describe [Ulrichs] as the first gay person to publicly out himself."

1869 
A German pamphlet by the Austrian-born novelist Karl-Maria Kertbeny (1824–1882), published anonymously, arguing against a Prussian anti-sodomy law contains the first known use of the word "homosexual" in print.
 Suriname decriminalizes homosexuality.

1870s

1870 
 Joseph and His Friend: A Story of Pennsylvania is published, possibly the first American novel about a homosexual relationship.

1871 
 Homosexuality is criminalized throughout the German Empire by Paragraph 175 of the Reich Criminal Code. It made homosexual acts between males a crime, and in early revisions the provision also criminalized bestiality. The Nazis broadened the law in 1935; in the prosecutions that followed, thousands died in Nazi concentration camps. It was repealed on 10 March 1994.
 Guatemala decriminalizes homosexuality.
 Mexico decriminalizes homosexuality.

1880s

1880 
 The Empire of Japan decriminalized homosexual acts (anal sodomy), having only made them illegal during the early years of the Meiji Restoration
 Paraguay decriminalizes homosexuality.

1885 
 In the United Kingdom, the Criminal Law Amendment Act 1885, whose Labouchere Amendment (Clause 11) outlaws oral sex between men—but not women—is given royal assent by Queen Victoria. A popular legend claims that Victoria struck references to lesbianism from the Act because of her refusal to believe that women "did such things"; in reality, they had simply never been mentioned in the Act. Clause 11 reads:
Any male person who, in public or private, commits, or is a party to the commission of, or procures or attempts to procure the commission by any male person of, any act of gross indecency with another male person, shall be guilty of a misdemeanor, and being convicted thereof shall be liable at the discretion of the court to be imprisoned for any term not exceeding two years, with or without hard labour.
Buggery, or anal sex between men, was already illegal.

1886 
 We'wha, a lhamana of the Zuni tribe, begins a six-month stay in Washington, D.C., during which time they call upon President Grover Cleveland.
 In England, the Criminal Law Amendment Act 1885, outlawing sexual relations between men (but not between women) is given royal assent by Queen Victoria. 
 Portugal re-criminalizes homosexual acts.

1889 
 The Cleveland Street Scandal erupts in England.

1890s

1890 
Homosexuality is legalized in Italy. 
Homosexuality is legalized in the Vatican.

1892 
 The words "bisexual" and "heterosexual" are first used in English in their current senses in Charles Gilbert Chaddock's translation of Kraft-Ebing's Psychopathia Sexualis.

1892 
 Popular, openly bisexual poet Edna St. Vincent Millay is born on 22 February.

1894 
 Biologist and pioneer of human sexuality Alfred Kinsey is born on 23 June.

1895 
 The trial of Oscar Wilde results in his being prosecuted under the Criminal Law Amendment Act 1885 for "gross indecency" and sentenced to two years hard labor in prison. 
 In Brazil, Adolfo Caminha publishes his controversial novel Bom-Crioulo (in English:The Black Man and the Cabin Boy) with homosexuality at its center and with a Black man as the story's hero.

1897 
 December — Magnus Hirschfeld petitions the Reichstag to abolish Paragraph 175, the first salvo in a lifelong campaign for repeal.
 George Cecil Ives organizes the first homosexual rights group in England, the Order of Chaeronea.

1899 
 Honduras decriminalizes homosexuality.

See also

 Timeline of LGBT history – timeline of events from 12,000 BCE to present
 LGBT rights by country or territory – current legal status around the world
 LGBT social movements
 Timeline of LGBT history, 20th century
 Timeline of LGBT history, 21st century
 Timeline of transgender history

Notes

References

 Miller, Neil (1995). Out of the Past: Gay and Lesbian History from 1869 to the Present. New York, Vintage Books. .

19th century in LGBT history
19th century in politics
LGBT rights by year
19th-century timelines
LGBT timelines